Nunavut Arctic College Media is a university press associated with the division of the Nunavut Arctic College, located in Iqaluit, Canada. The press releases works that promote knowledge of Inuit culture, language, and history. Nunavut Arctic College Media is a member of the Association of Canadian University Presses and the Association of Canadian Publishers.

See also

 List of university presses

References

External links 
Nunavut Arctic College Media

Education in Nunavut
University presses of Canada